= Myrsineae =

Coordinates: 37°02′54″N 25°07′38″E

Myrsineae or Myrsineai (Ancient Greek: Μυρσινέαι) was a town of ancient Greece on the island of Paros. The town is mentioned in several inscriptions.

Its site is located on Paros.
